Argyroploce arbutella is a moth of the family Tortricidae. It is found in most of Europe, from Fennoscandia and northern Russia to the Pyrenees, Sardinia, Italy and Bulgaria and from Ireland to Poland and Romania.

The wingspan is 13–15 mm. Adults are purplish red or red brown with silvery striations. The head and thorax fuscous, crimson-tinged. Forewings reddish-ferruginous, irregularly
striated with leaden-grey or silver grey. The hindwings are  grey. The larva is blackish-grey. Julius von Kennel provides a full description. 
 
They are on wing from May to June.

The larvae feed on Arctostaphylos uva-ursi and Vaccinium vitis-idaea. They mine the leaves of their host plant. The mine consists of a full depth irregular blotch mine. They only live as a leaf miner for a short period of time before leaving the mine to live freely among spun leaves. At this point they feed from within spun terminal shoots of their host plant. Larvae can be found from April to May.

References

Moths described in 1758
Taxa named by Carl Linnaeus
Olethreutini
Tortricidae of Europe